Keith McGuinness (24 March 1933 – 25 September 2020) was an Australian rules footballer who played with South Melbourne in the Victorian Football League (VFL).

McGuinness played for the Camberwell Football Club in 1953 and 1954.

Notes

External links 

2020 deaths
1933 births
Australian rules footballers from Victoria (Australia)
Sydney Swans players
Camberwell Football Club players